Flickinger v Crown Colony of Hong Kong was the first Bill of Rights case to reach the Court of Appeal. It concerned whether detained persons should be granted the right to appeal unsuccessful applications for Habeas corpus and how statutes should be interpreted in light of the Bill of Rights Act 1990

Background
Robert Lee Flickinger was an American fraudster on the run from Hong Kong authorities after being charged with 37 counts related to commercial fraud. Flickinger had been imprisoned in Mount Eden Prison to await rendition to Hong Kong to stand trial following an eight-week hearing in the District Court. Flickinger subsequently sought an order under the Fugitive Offenders Act 1881 (UK) that the court discharge him and also a writ of Habeas corpus in the High Court. The High Court declined these applications in October 1990. Flickinger appealed the High Court's decision to the Court of Appeal.

The legal problem facing the Court of Appeal was as President Cooke noted,
 

However as Cooke noted, s 6 of the Bill of Rights Act required courts to interpret legislation to have meanings consistent with the rights and freedoms contained in the Bill of Rights and s 23(1)(c) of BoRA provided that everyone arrested or detained, "shall have the right to have the validity of the arrest or detention determined without delay by way of habeas corpus and to be released if the arrest or detention is not lawful".

Judgment
President Cooke gave the judgment of the Court, noting, 
 

Michael Taggart, in an influential article on the operation of the Bill of Rights Act, reasoned that the judgment, by inferring that BoRA allows appeals on Habeas corpus applications when s 23(1)(c) of BoRA only calls for a right to challenge a detention, was so generous, "the right's cup runneth over".

Habeas Corpus Act 2001
Section 16 of the Habeas Corpus Act 2001 now provides for rights of appeal in habeas corpus applications. Thus as the Court of Appeal observed in 2003, "Since the enactment of the New Zealand Bill of Rights Act 1990 with its guarantee of the availability of habeas corpus, the question has arisen whether appeal rights in habeas corpus cases might now be seen differently... That question is now hypothetical since the legislature had answered it by conferring rights of appeal."

References

1990 in New Zealand law
Court of Appeal of New Zealand cases
1990 in case law
Habeas corpus